The Hotel Kirkwood, also known as the Kirkwood Civic Center Hotel, is a historic building located in downtown Des Moines, Iowa, United States. The building was designed by the Chicago architectural firm of H.L. Stevens & Company and built in 1930. With its completion it became the largest hotel along Fourth Street between Walnut Street and Court Avenue, along Des Moines' "Hotel Row." It also marked the emergence of the skyscraper hotel in the downtown area. The new hotel replaced a previous Hotel Kirkwood that had been built on the same location in 1862. It was located near Union Station and the Rock Island Depot. Developers and owners of the 1930 Hotel Kirkwood were E.F. Tagney and S.F. McGinn. Art Deco details are found in the building's massing, the sleek exterior geometrical detailing, and treatment of the cornice. It is listed on the National Register of Historic Places in 2003. The building has subsequently been converted into an apartment building called "The Kirkwood."

Gallery

References

Hotel buildings completed in 1930
Art Deco architecture in Iowa
Hotel buildings on the National Register of Historic Places in Iowa
Apartment buildings in Des Moines, Iowa
National Register of Historic Places in Des Moines, Iowa